Stenanthemum tridentatum is a species of flowering plant in the family Rhamnaceae and is endemic to the southwest of Western Australia. It is a prostrate to upright shrub with sparsely hairy young stems, egg-shaped to fan-shaped leaves, and creamy white or creamy-yellow flowers arranged singly or in groups of up to three.

Description

Taxonomy and naming
This species was first formally described in 1845 by Ernst Gottlieb von Steudel who gave it the name Cryptandra tridentata in Lehmann's Plantae Preissianae. In 1858, Siegfried Reissek transferred it to Stenanthemum as Stenanthemum tridentatus in the journal Linnaea.

Distribution and habitat
Stenanthemum tridentatum grows in woodland and shrubland between Gunyidi and Tambellup in the Avon Wheatbelt, Esperance Plains, Geraldton Sandplains, Jarrah Forest and Mallee bioregions of southwestern Western Australia.

Conservation status
This species is listed as "not threatened" by the Government of Western Australia Department of Biodiversity, Conservation and Attractions.

References

tridentatum
Rosales of Australia
Flora of Western Australia
Plants described in 1845
Taxa named by Ernst Gottlieb von Steudel